Condylostylus caudatus is a species of long-legged fly in the family Dolichopodidae.

References

External links

 

Sciapodinae
Articles created by Qbugbot
Insects described in 1830
Taxa named by Christian Rudolph Wilhelm Wiedemann